Juan Carlos "JC" Shinzato Bonnin (born February 2, 1968, Okinawa, Japan) is a retired Filipino actor. He was a matinee idol in the 1980s, best remembered for his role in Bagets.

Career
Bonnin comes from a family of well-known showbiz personalities. His uncle, Bernard Bonnin married to Elvira Gonzalez, were former actors. His cousins are former beauty queen/actress Charlene González (now married to actor Aga Muhlach) and former actor Richard Bonnin.

He began his acting career in 1981, where he bagged the role of Monty in Flordeluna. The following year, he bagged his first leading role with Sharon Cuneta in Cross My Heart. He got his biggest break when he became part of Bagets. He later on starred in various movies with Viva, including Ninja Kids and Kamagong.

He retired from showbiz in 1987 and attended bible school. In 1998, he moved to the United Kingdom where he became a pastor. In 2011, he moved to the United States, where he works as a hospice chaplain and spiritual counselor.

Filmography

Movies
Cross My Heart (1982)
Zimatar (1982)
Daddy Knows Best (1983)
Bagets (1984)
14 Going Steady (1984)
Bagets 2 (1984)
Ma'am May We Go Out? (1986)
Kamagong (1986)
Ninja Kids (1986)

Television
Flordeluna (1981)
That's Entertainment (1986)
Julian Talisman (1988)

References

External links

Filipino male film actors
Living people
1968 births
Filipino male television actors
Actors from Okinawa Prefecture